Lepidochrysops nacrescens is a butterfly in the family Lycaenidae. It is found in Angola.

Adults have been recorded on wing in September.

References

Butterflies described in 1961
Lepidochrysops
Endemic fauna of Angola
Butterflies of Africa